Dennis Janssen (born 14 September 1992) is a Dutch professional footballer who plays as a defensive midfielder for UDI '19.

External links
 

1992 births
Footballers from Nijmegen
Living people
Dutch footballers
Association football midfielders
TOP Oss players
De Treffers players
Eerste Divisie players
Tweede Divisie players